Adirondack Iron and Steel Company is a historic ironworks complex located at Tahawus in Essex County, New York. It consists of the remains of the "Upper Works" iron foundry that date back to 1826. Iron from the site was contaminated with titanium, which, together with its isolation, made for an unprofitable venture.

It was listed on the National Register of Historic Places in 1977.

References

External links

Industrial buildings and structures on the National Register of Historic Places in New York (state)
Historic American Engineering Record in New York (state)
Industrial buildings completed in 1854
Buildings and structures in Essex County, New York
Adirondacks
National Register of Historic Places in Essex County, New York
1854 establishments in New York (state)